The Jos Brink Award (Jos Brink Prijs in Dutch) is a Dutch LGBT emancipation prize, founded in 2008 by the Dutch government. It is awarded every two years and named after the Dutch gay actor, cabaret artist and writer Jos Brink (1942-2007).

Since 2011, a Jos Brink Innovation Prize (Jos Brink Innovatie Prijs) is awarded besides a Jos Brink Oeuvre Prize. In 2015, only the former prize was awarded.

General background 
The Jos Brink Prijs was initiated by the Dutch Ministry of Education, Culture and Science, which is responsible for emancipation. It is awarded every two years to "a person or organization working on the acceptance of lesbians, homosexuals, bisexuals, transgender and intersex people".

The prize is awarded on or around May 17, the International Day Against Homophobia, Biphobia and Transphobia. The winner receives a monetary prize of EUR 10,000, and a work of art.

Winners

External links
 Official website

References

Dutch awards
LGBT in the Netherlands